Patrick Nicholas Capri (November 27, 1918 – June 14, 1989) was a former Major League Baseball player. He played one season with the Boston Braves in 1944.

References

External links

Boston Braves players
Major League Baseball second basemen
1918 births
1989 deaths
Baseball players from New York City
Fostoria Red Birds players
American people of Italian descent
Williamson Red Birds players
Asheville Tourists players
Indianapolis Indians players
Columbus Red Birds players
Burials at Green-Wood Cemetery